Eupithecia intolerabilis is a moth in the family Geometridae. It is found in China (Yunnan).

References

Moths described in 1981
intolerabilis
Moths of Asia